Dobropillia Raion (translit.: Dobropil's'kyi raion; , translit.: Dobropol'skiy raion) was a raion (district) within the southwestern part of Donetsk Oblast in eastern Ukraine. Its administrative center was Dobropillia, which was incorporated separately as the town of oblast significance and did not belong to the raion. The raion was abolished on 18 July 2020 as part of the administrative reform of Ukraine, which reduced the number of raions of Donetsk Oblast to eight, of which only five were controlled by the government. The last estimate of the raion population was {.

Within Dobropillia Raion there were one urban-type settlement (Sviatohorivka - 2,100 inhabitants),  9 selsoviets, and 66 settlements. Also included within the raion were: 17 kolhozy, and 3 sovhozy, 4 industrial organizations, 4 construction organizations, 2 railroad stations, 44 Meduchredzheniy, and 47 libraries.

An architectural monument in the raion was a palace (1887-1914-selo Zelyenoe).

In May 2014, due to the deteriorating situation in the Donetsk Oblast, the raion requested a referendum pertaining to the transfer of Dobropillia Raion into the Dnipropetrovsk Oblast, where the situation was more stable. The then Dnipropetrovsk Governor Ihor Kolomoisky announced that the oblast would be willing to do so assuming that is what the citizens want.

Settlements

Vodianske
Volodymyrivka
Virovka
Hannivka
Zolotyi Kolodiaz
Krasnoiarske
Kryvorizhia
Novyi Donbas
Novovodiane
Novodonetske
Novotoretske
Novotroitske
Novofedorivka
Oktiabrske
Rozy Liuksemburh
Sviatohorivka
Svitle
Shevchenko
Shylivka

Demographics 
As of the 2001 Ukrainian census:

Ethnicity
 Ukrainians: 89.4%
 Russians: 8.9%

See also
 Administrative divisions of Donetsk Oblast

References

External links

 Verkhovna Rada website - Administrative divisions of the Dobropillia Raion

Former raions of Donetsk Oblast
1966 establishments in Ukraine
Ukrainian raions abolished during the 2020 administrative reform